Duda is a given name and surname. Notable people with the name include:

Given name
Duda Salabert (born 1981/82), Brazilian politician and teacher
Duda Sanadze (born 1992), a Georgian basketball player
Duda Yankovich (born 1976), a Serbian Brazilian fighter in boxing and mixed martial arts

Surname
In Slavic languages, the surname derives from the nickname for a bagpipes player (from "duda" which means a bagpipe). In Czech, it may also originate from the word "dudek" (hoopoe), while in Hungarian comes either from the old secular name "Duda" or is an abbreviated version of "Dudás".

Arts and entertainment
Elisabeth Duda (born 1979), Polish writer, film and television actress
Harry Duda (born 1944), Polish poet and publicist
Jerzy Duda-Gracz (1941–2004), Polish painter
John Duda (born 1977), American film actor
Jörg Duda (born 1968), German composer
Kelly Duda (born 1966), American filmmaker and activist 
Mariusz Duda (born 1975), Polish musician and composer
Steve Duda, American DJ, record producer, engineer and manager

Politics
Agata Kornhauser-Duda (born 1972), Polish former teacher and first lady of Poland
Andrzej Duda (born 1972), President of Poland
Joanna Duda-Gwiazda, wife of the Polish trade unionist and politician Andrzej Gwiazda

Sports and games
Adam Duda (born 1991), Polish footballer
Bogusław Duda (born 1953), Polish racewalker
Brigitte Duda (born 1961), Austrian diver
Denis Duda (born 1996), Albanian footballer
Jan-Krzysztof Duda (born 1998), Polish chess player
Jason Duda (born 1975), Canadian ice hockey player
Lucas Duda (born 1986), American baseball player
Mark Duda (born 1961), American football defensive tackle  
Ondrej Duda (born 1994), Slovak footballer
Paul Duda (born 1943), Canadian football player
Radek Duda (born 1979), Czech ice hockey player
René Duda (born 1996), Slovak football midfielder

Other
Bonaventura Duda (1924–2017), Croatian Franciscan friar, theologian and member of the Croatian Academy of Sciences and Arts
Oswald Duda (1869–1941), German entomologist
Radu Duda (born 1960), Romanian prince
Richard O. Duda, American professor of electrical engineering

See also
Duda (disambiguation)
Dūda (surname)

References